Al-Qasimi is the family name of an Arab dynasty. Other people with the surname include:

Azza Sultan Al-Qasimi (born 1973), Emirati artist and businesswoman
Khalid bin Sultan Al Qasimi (fashion designer) (1980-2019), Emirati fashion designer
Sheikha Najla Al Qasimi (born 1970), Emirati diplomat